Benjamin Lear (May 12, 1879 – November 1, 1966) was a United States Army general who served in the Spanish–American War, Philippine Insurrection, World War I and World War II. He also competed at the 1912 Summer Olympics.

Early career
Ben Lear was born in Hamilton, Ontario, on May 12, 1879. His military service began in 1898, when he enlisted with the 1st Colorado Infantry, USV, for the Spanish–American War as a first sergeant. He was promoted to second lieutenant during the Philippine–American War in the 1st Colorado and later in the 36th Infantry, USV, then joined the regular army as a sergeant at the end of the war. He subsequently served in World War I.

He was a 1912 Olympian, part of the equestrian team which won the bronze medal in the three-day team event.

Lear graduated from the Army School of the Line in 1922, the Army General Staff School in 1923, and the Army War College in 1926.

He was promoted to brigadier general in May 1936 and major general in October 1938. He commanded the 1st Cavalry Division from 1936 to 1938, and the Pacific Sector of the Panama Canal Zone from 1938 to 1940.

World War II

Stateside duty

Lear was promoted to lieutenant general in October 1940 and was commanding general of U.S. Second Army from October 20, 1940 to April 25, 1943. As such, he was responsible for training a large number of U.S. soldiers during World War II. He became known as a strict disciplinarian.

It was in the lead-up to these maneuvers that Lear acquired the nickname "Yoo-Hoo".  Lear was playing golf at the country club in Memphis, Tennessee, in civilian clothes on July 6, 1941, when a convoy of 80 U.S. Army trucks carrying men of the 110th Quartermaster Regiment, 35th Division rolled past. The troops in the passing trucks subjected a group of women in shorts to a series of whistles and "lewd and obscene" catcalls.

Lear had the convoy stopped, and told the officers that this conduct was unacceptable and they had disgraced the Army. Lear's punishment was to make every one of the 350 men in the convoy march  of the  trip back to Camp Joseph T. Robinson, Arkansas in three 5-mile sections. This they did in the  heat. Many men straggled and a number collapsed. There was storm of public criticism of Lear's action from people who felt that the soldiers had been harshly and collectively punished when many had done nothing wrong. The commander of the 35th Division, Major General Ralph E. Truman, was well-connected politically, his cousin being Senator Harry S. Truman, and some congressmen called for Lear to be retired. However, to Army eyes this was not a case of sexual harassment but of indiscipline, and no action was taken against Lear. The derogatory nickname "Yoo-Hoo" stuck.

During the Louisiana Maneuvers, Lear led his U.S. Second Army against the U.S. Third Army under Lieutenant General  Walter Krueger. In these maneuvers, Lear judged the control and discipline of the 35th Division to be unsatisfactory, and relieved Truman of his command.

Lear continued in command of Second Army until he was relieved by Lieutenant General Lloyd Fredendall in April 1943.

Retirement and recall to active duty

Lear was administratively retired in May 1943, having reached the mandatory retirement age of 64, but was immediately recalled to active duty to serve on the Personnel Board of the Secretary of War, and promoted to lieutenant general. He became Commanding General of Army Ground Forces on 14 July 1944 when Lieutenant General Lesley J. McNair, his predecessor, was killed in Normandy on 25 July 1944.

After the German counter-attack in the Ardennes caused a manpower crisis, in January 1945 he was appointed deputy commander of European Theater of Operations, US Army, responsible for theater manpower. As such, he overhauled the replacement system, but the war against Germany ended before the full benefits of his reforms could be realized.

Retirement
Lear fully retired from the army in July 1945 and was promoted to general on 19 July 1954, by special act of Congress (Public Law 83-508). He settled in Memphis, Tennessee after retirement.

He died at the Veterans Administration Hospital in Murfreesboro, Tennessee, on 1 November 1966, and was buried on 3 November 1966 in Arlington National Cemetery, Section 4, Grave 2690.

Decorations and medals

Promotions

References

External links

Generals of World War II

1879 births
1966 deaths
Canadian military personnel from Ontario
American military personnel of the Philippine–American War
American military personnel of the Spanish–American War
United States Army personnel of World War I
Recipients of the Distinguished Service Medal (US Army)
Recipients of the Silver Star
American male equestrians
Olympic bronze medalists for the United States in equestrian
Equestrians at the 1912 Summer Olympics
American event riders
Sportspeople from Hamilton, Ontario
Medalists at the 1912 Summer Olympics
United States Army Command and General Staff College alumni
United States Army War College alumni
United States Army generals of World War II
United States Army generals
People from Memphis, Tennessee
Burials at Arlington National Cemetery